Liberty Professionals Football Club is a Ghanaian professional football club based in Dansoman, Accra.

History
Liberty Professionals was founded in 1996 by Accra-based businessmen Felix Ansong and Alhaji Sly Tetteh. The club was one of the earliest in Ghana to adopt a professional approach to the management of a football club. The club started their first season in the Poly Tank Division One League,but were promoted to the Ghana Telecom Premier League within their second season in 1998. Since then, the club has consistently maintained respectable league match performances. As of 2020, the team had an estimated net worth of $4.31million.

In July 2021, the club was relegated to the Ghana Division One League at the end of the 2020–21 season, after 22 years in the Ghana Premier League since gaining promotion in 1998.

Performance in CAF competitions
West African Club Championship (UFOA Cup): 1 appearance
 2009 – Third

Stadium
Their home stadium is Carl Reindorf Park which can seat up to 2,000 people. In April 2021, during the latter part of the 2020–21 season they switched to WAFA (West African Football Academy) Stadium in Sogakope.

Current squad

Notable players

Academy

Liberty Professionals have three youth academies in Kenya, Togo and Ghana. Michael Essien played for the Ghana Academy for the 1998–99 season. Mubarak Alhassan, an academy graduate joined Granada CF in 2020. Abraham Wayo an academy graduate ended the 2020–21 season as the club's top goal scorer and later secured a deal to Tunisian Ligue Professionnelle 1 club Étoile Sportive du Sahel.

Managers
 Sellas Tetteh (1996–2001)
 Cecil Jones Attuquayefio (2002)
 Sellas Tetteh (2009–2010)
 Joseph Emmanuel Sarpong (Jan 1, 2011 – July 8, 2012)
 George Lamptey (July 1, 2012–Oct 1, 2016)
 Michael Osei (May 2017 –February 2018)
 David Ocloo (December 2019 –April 2021) 
 Andy Sinason & Sellas Tetteh (interim) (April 2021 –)

References

External links
Ghana-pedia webpage – Liberty Professionals FC

 
Association football clubs established in 1996
Football clubs in Ghana
Football clubs in Accra
1996 establishments in Ghana
Sports clubs in Ghana